Trochaclis is a genus of sea snails, marine gastropod mollusks in the family Trochaclididae.

Species
Species within the genus Trochaclis include:

 Trochaclis antarctica Thiele, 1912
 Trochaclis attenuata Marshall, 1995
 † Trochaclis atypica (Laws, 1939) 
 † Trochaclis bucina (Laws, 1941) 
 Trochaclis calva Marshall, 1995
 Trochaclis carinata Hoffman, Gofas & Freiwald, 2020
 Trochaclis cristata Marshall, 1995
 Trochaclis elata Marshall, 1995
 Trochaclis fortis Hoffman, Gofas & Freiwald, 2020
 † Trochaclis isabellae Tabanelli, Bongiardino & Scarponi, 2017 
 Trochaclis islandica Warén, 1989
 † Trochaclis kaiparica B. A. Marshall, 1995 
 † Trochaclis morningtonensis B. A. Marshall, 1995 
 Trochaclis platoensis Hoffman, Gofas & Freiwald, 2020
 Trochaclis regalis Marshall, 1995
 Trochaclis versiliensis Warén, Carrozza & Rocchini in Warén, 1992
Species brought into synonymy
 Trochaclis islandicus Warén, 1989: synonym of Trochaclis islandica Warén, 1989

References

 Marshall, B.A. 1995:  Recent and Tertiary Trochaclididae from the southwest Pacific (Mollusca: Gastropoda: Trochoidae).  The Veliger 38: 92-115.

External links
 Thiele, J. (1912). Die antarktischen Schnecken und Muscheln. Deutsche Südpolar-Expedition 1901-1903. Wissenschaftliche Ergebnisse. 13, Zoologie. 5(2): 185-285, pls 11-19
  Gofas, S.; Le Renard, J.; Bouchet, P. (2001). Mollusca, in: Costello, M.J. et al. (Ed.) (2001). European register of marine species: a check-list of the marine species in Europe and a bibliography of guides to their identification. Collection Patrimoines Naturels, 50: pp. 180–213

Trochaclididae